Vimieiro is the name of several places in Portugal:

 Vimiero (Arraiolos), a freguesia (civil parish) in Arraiolos Municipality
 Vimieiro (Braga), a civil parish in the municipality of Braga
 Vimieiro (Santa Comba Dão), a village, part of the civil parish União das Freguesias de Óvoa e Vimieiro in the municipality of Santa Comba Dão

See also 
 Vimeiro, a civil parish in the municipality of Lourinhã in Oeste (intermunicipal community)
 Battle of Vimeiro, an 1808 victory of British forces under Wellington over French forces under Junot during the Peninsular War
 Battle of Vimeiro order of battle